Glaucocharis propepraemialis is a moth in the family Crambidae. It was described by David Edward Gaskin in 1974. It is found on the New Hebrides.

References

Diptychophorini
Moths described in 1974